Álvaro Ortiz Becerra (born 25 November 1995) is a Mexican professional golfer.

Early life
Ortiz was born in Guadalajara, Jalisco, Mexico. He played college golf in the United States at the University of Arkansas from 2014 to 2018. At the 2017 Summer Universiade, he finished 9th in the individual competition and was on the Mexican team that won the silver medal. He played in the Mexican team in the Eisenhower Trophy in 2014, 2016, and 2018. He won the 2019 Latin America Amateur Championship, a result which gained him an invitation to the 2019 Masters Tournament. Ortiz had been runner-up in the event in 2017 and 2018. In the Masters, he made the cut and finished tied for 36th place with a score of 286, 2-under-par, one stroke behind Viktor Hovland, who won the Silver Cup as the leading amateur.

His older brother, Carlos, is also a professional golfer.

Professional career
Ortiz turned professional in 2019 after the Masters Tournament. In January 2020, Ortiz won a qualifying event for the PGA Tour Latinoamérica to gain a place on the tour. In the first event of the season, the Estrella del Mar Open, he was runner-up behind Alexandre Rocha. The tour was then suspended because of the COVID-19 pandemic, being replaced by the LocaliQ Series which was held in the second half of 2020. The PGA Tour Latinoamérica season was extended into 2021 and Ortiz won the first event of the year, the Abierto Mexicano de Golf.

Amateur wins
2013 Campeonato Nacional Interzonas LIII
2014 Torneo Nacional Copa Yucatan, World Junior Team Qualifier
2016 The Aggie Invitational, Torneo Annual Guadalajara Country Club
2017 Torneo Annual Guadalajara Country Club
2018 Torneo Annual Guadalajara Country Club, Campeonato Nacional Interclubes Mexico
2019 Latin America Amateur Championship

Source:

Professional wins (1)

PGA Tour Latinoamérica wins (1)

Results in major championships
Results not in chronological order in 2020.

"T" = Tied
CUT = missed the halfway cut
NT = No tournament due to COVID-19 pandemic

Team appearances
Amateur
Eisenhower Trophy (representing Mexico): 2014, 2016, 2018
Arnold Palmer Cup (representing the International team): 2018

References

External links

Mexican male golfers
Arkansas Razorbacks men's golfers
Pan American Games competitors for Mexico
Golfers at the 2015 Pan American Games
Universiade medalists in golf
Universiade silver medalists for Mexico
Medalists at the 2017 Summer Universiade
Sportspeople from Guadalajara, Jalisco
1995 births
Living people
21st-century Mexican people